The 1951–52 Southern Football League season was the 49th in the history of the league, an English football competition.

At the end of the previous season Torquay United resigned their second team from the league. No new clubs had joined the league for this season so the league consisted of 22 remaining clubs. Merthyr Tydfil were champions for the third season in a row, winning their fourth Southern League title. Five Southern League clubs applied to join the Football League at the end of the season, but none were successful.

League table

Football League elections
Five Southern League clubs applied for election to the Football League. However, none were successful as all four League clubs were re-elected.

References

Southern Football League seasons
S